Brandi Alexander (born March 1, 1974) is a professional wrestler. During her decade long plus career, she has wrestled in many wrestling federations, such as World Wrestling Entertainment (WWE), World Championship Wrestling (WCW), National Wrestling Alliance (NWA), American Wrestling Association (AWA), World League Wrestling (WLW), Professional Girl Wrestling Association (PGWA), World Wrestling Council (WWC), Carolina Wrestling Federation (CWF), FWA, and LAW.

Early life
In her youth, Alexander enjoyed wrestling and was a fan of Sherri Martel. After meeting Tony Altomare, a former tag team partner of Lou Albano, Alexander looked into training at The Fabulous Moolah's school in North Carolina. Because there were no females at the school and because she was reluctant to move to a new state, Alexander began her wrestling training at the Monster Factory under Larry Sharpe and Glenn Ruth.

Professional wrestling career
Alexander began her wrestling career in 1993.

On February 27, 1998, Alexander was defeated by Brittany Brown, the latter retaining her NWA New Jersey Championship at the Third Annual Eddie Gilbert Memorial Brawl at the Airport Radisson Hotel in Philadelphia, Pennsylvania. The Fabulous Moolah was in Brown's corner while Fred The Elephant Boy from The Howard Stern Show  was at ringside with Alexander.

Alexander worked two matches for World Championship Wrestling in 1999. She considers one of her biggest wins to be defeating Miss Madness on an episode of WCW Thunder. Miss Madness, however, won their rematch the following week. Also in 1999, she appeared at World Wrestling Council's annual event WWC Anniversary, defeating Malia Hosaka in a singles match.

In mid-2003, Alexander won the Carolina Wrestling Federation's Women's Championship from Amber Holly.

Championships and accomplishments
Appalachian Pro Wrestling
APW Cruiserweight Champion (1 time)
Canadian Wrestling Alliance
CWA Women's Championship (1 time)
Carolina Wrestling Federation
CWF Women's Championship (1 time)
Continental Wrestling Alliance
CWA Continental Women's Championship (1 time)
Frontier Wrestling Alliance
FWA Women's Championship (1 time)
Independent Wrestling Council
IWC Women's Championship (1 time)
Ladies All-Pro Wrestling
LAW International Television Championship (1 time)
New England Wrestling
NEW Women's Championship (1 time)
Southern States Wrestling
SSW Women's Championship (2 times)
Ultimate Championship Wrestling
UCW Women's Championship (1 time)
World League Wrestling
WLW Ladies Championship (1 time)
World Wide Wrestling Alliance
WWWA Woman's Championship (2 times)

References

External links
Brandi Alexander at G.L.O.R.Y Wrestling
Profile at Online World Of Wrestling

1974 births
Living people
American female professional wrestlers
People from Fayetteville, West Virginia
Professional wrestlers from West Virginia
21st-century American women
20th-century professional wrestlers
21st-century professional wrestlers